Song Qingwei (born March 1929 – 27 December 2022) was a general in the People's Liberation Army of China who was a political commissar of the Jinan Military Region from 1987 to 1994.

He was a delegate to the 6th and 7th National People's Congress and a member of the standing committee of the 9th National People's Congress. He was a representative of the 13th, 14th and 15th National Congress of the Chinese Communist Party. He was a member of the 14th Central Committee of the Chinese Communist Party.

Biography
Song was born Song Qinghu in Ling County (now Lincheng District of Dezhou), Shandong, in March 1929. 

He enlisted in the Eighth Route Army in June 1945, and joined the Chinese Communist Party (CCP) in October the same year.

After the establishment of the Communist State, he served in the Fuzhou Military District for a long time. In June 1985, he was made deputy political commissar of the Jinan Military Region], rising to political commissar in November 1987. He retired in July 2003.

He was promoted to the rank of lieutenant general (zhongjiang) in September 1988 and general (shangjiang) in May 1994.

From 1998 to 2003, he was the vice chairman of the National People's Congress Foreign Affairs Committee.

In 2022, Son died from COVID-19 at the age of 93.

Work

References

1929 births
2022 deaths
People from Dezhou
People's Liberation Army generals from Shandong
People's Republic of China politicians from Shandong
Chinese Communist Party politicians from Shandong
Delegates to the 6th National People's Congress
Delegates to the 7th National People's Congress
Members of the Standing Committee of the 9th National People's Congress
Members of the 14th Central Committee of the Chinese Communist Party
Deaths from the COVID-19 pandemic in China